The Atitlán grebe (Podilymbus gigas), also known as giant grebe, giant pied-billed grebe, or poc, is an extinct water bird, a relative of the pied-billed grebe. It was endemic at the Lago de Atitlán in Guatemala at an altitude of 1700 m asl. It was described in 1929 by Ludlow Griscom based on a specimen collected in 1926 and had been overlooked in the past. American ecologist Anne LaBastille observed the decline of this species over a period of 25 years. It was declared extinct by 1990.

Description 
The Atitlán grebe reached a length of about 46–50 cm. The call and appearance were similar to the much smaller pied-billed grebe. The bill was large and pied but the color varied from white in the spring to brown in other seasons. The plumage was mainly dark brown with white-flecked flanks and grey on the ears. The underparts were dark grey flecked with white. The head was almost black and the neck was glossy flecked with dark brown in the spring and white in the winter. The legs were slaty grey. The bill had a bold black vertical band in the middle. The irises were brown. It had small wings and was flightless.

Reproduction 
They laid a clutch of 4 to 5 white eggs. Both parents shared the rearing of the hatchlings.

Extinction
The decline of the Atitlán grebe began in 1958 and again in 1960 after smallmouth bass (Micropterus dolomieu) and largemouth bass (Micropterus salmoides) were introduced into Lake Atitlán. These invasive species reduced the crabs and fish which the grebes depended on for food and killed grebe chicks. The population of the Atitlán grebe declined from 200 individuals in 1960 to 80 in 1965. Thanks to the conservation efforts of Anne LaBastille, in 1966 a refuge was established where this species was able to rebound. The population recovered to 210 in 1973. Unfortunately after the 1976 Guatemala earthquake, the lake bed fractured. An underwater drain led to a fall of the water level and to a further severe decrease of the number of grebes. In 1983 only 32 individuals were left, of which the largest part were hybrids with the pied-billed grebe. The last two birds were seen in 1989, and after they disappeared the Atitlán grebe was declared officially extinct.

See also
 Alaotra grebe, probably extinct since the late 1980s for analogous reasons.
 Colombian grebe

References

Flannery, Tim & Schouten, Peter (2001). A Gap in Nature: Discovering the World's Extinct Animals, Atlantic Monthly Press, New York. .
Errol Fuller (2000). Extinct Birds, 
Anne LaBastille (1990). Mama Poc: An Ecologist's Account of the Extinction of a Species, W. W. Norton & Company,

External links
Status of the Endemic Atitlan Grebe of Guatemala: Is it extinct?

Extinct flightless birds
Podilymbus
Birds of Guatemala
Endemic fauna of Guatemala
Natural history of Guatemala
Bird extinctions since 1500
Birds described in 1929
Extinct birds of North America